Patrick John Brown (November 9, 1952 – September 11, 2001) was an American fire captain who served in the New York City Fire Department and a veteran of the Vietnam War. He and his team were killed during the September 11, 2001, attacks, while trying to rescue people in the North Tower of World Trade Center.

Brown's remains were recovered from the rubble of the North Tower on December 14, 2001, and two weeks later his ashes were spread in Central Park, according to his wishes.

In 2006 his life and times were the subject of documentary film Finding Paddy.

Jennifer Murphy's First Responders tells the story of Patrick and his brother Michael, who ultimately succumbed to 9/11 related cancer. Michael Brown had written What Brothers Do in honor of Patrick.

Bibliography
 Watts, Sharon (2007). Miss You, Pat: Collected Memories of NY's Bravest of the Brave, Captain Patrick J. Brown. ISBN 978-1-4303-2704-2

References

1952 births
2001 deaths
New York City firefighters
People from Brooklyn
People murdered in New York City
Male murder victims
Terrorism deaths in New York (state)
Emergency workers killed in the September 11 attacks
American Federation of State, County and Municipal Employees people
American military personnel of the Vietnam War